Harriston is a census-designated place in Augusta County, Virginia. The population as of the 2010 Census was 909.

References

Census-designated places in Augusta County, Virginia
Census-designated places in Virginia